Teodoro Láscaris-Comneno (27 October 1921 – 20 September 2006), or just Teodoro Láscaris, was a Spanish Professor of Philosophy and the eldest son of Eugenio Láscaris, a Spanish lawyer who forged connections to the medieval Laskaris family, which had ruled the Byzantine Empire in Nicaea from 1204 to 1261. After Eugenio's death in 1962, Teodoro continued his father's pretensions, claiming to be the titular Emperor of Constantinople as Theodore IX Lascaris Comnenus, as well as the Grand Master of the Constantinian Order of Saint George.

Láscaris, and several of his siblings, left Spain after the death of their father due to the numerous controversies the family had become embroiled in. Accompanied by his brothers Eugenio and Constantino, Láscaris moved across the Atlantic and worked as a teacher in Latin America, teaching at universities in Costa Rica, Venezuela and Colombia. Though he maintained the legitimacy of his father's, and his own, claims, Teodoro was more interested in researching law, history and philosophy and maintaining the orders of Constantine the Great and Saint Helene (an invented order) than he was in pressing the invented claim to the throne of the Kingdom of Greece or Constantinople.

After having taught in Colombia for several years, Láscaris moved to Venezuela, where he became a professor of philosophy at the University of Carabobo. Láscaris propagated the idea that the Americas represent "New Byzantium" and the "Fourth Rome"; where Christian faith, Western thought and Greek civilization will continue to survive. After Teodoro's death in 2006, his son Eugenio (born on 10 October 1975) took the regnal name Eugene III Theodore Emmanuel Lascaris Comnenus, maintaining his family's claims.

See also 
 Succession to the Byzantine Empire

References 

1921 births
2006 deaths
Byzantine pretenders after 1453
Impostor pretenders
Spanish expatriates in Venezuela
Expatriates in Costa Rica
Spanish expatriates in Colombia